National Key Disciplines is a list of key disciplines currently recognized as important by the central government of the People's Republic of China.

The assessment and rating of national key disciplines have been conducted during the period between 1988 and 2012.

Disciplines
Here is a non exhaustive list of the disciplines listed as being National Key Disciplines. 

Medicine
Science
Chemistry
Engineering
Commerce
Law
Most of the universities with first-level national key disciplines have now been included in the Chinese state Double First Class University Plan.

See also
List of universities in China
Double First Class University Plan
State Key Laboratory

References

External links
:zh:中华人民共和国全国重点大学列表 (list)
National list of key universities - China Education Online

Higher education in China